Calytrix eneabbensis is a species of plant in the myrtle family Myrtaceae that is endemic to Western Australia.

It blooms between July and October producing pink-purple-yellow star-shaped flowers.

Found on sand plains in the Mid West region of Western Australia centred around Eneabba where it grows on sandy soils over laterite.

References

Plants described in 1987
eneabbensi
Flora of Western Australia